AS-17, AS.17 or As 17 may refer to:

 Airspeed AS.17, a British unbuilt licensed copy of the Fokker D.XVII biplane fighter
 Argus As 17, a German aircraft engine
 AS-17 Krypton, NATO reporting name for the Russian Kh-31 air-to-surface missile
 , a United States Navy submarine tender